French Judo Federation (is the sports association that aims to promote the practice of Judo and related disciplines composed of jujitsu, kendo, iaïdo, sport chanbara, Jōdō, naginata, Kyūdō, sumo and taïso.

Created on December 5, 1946 under the name of the French Judo and Jiu-Jitsu Federation (FFJJJ), its first president was Paul Bonet-Maury from 1946 to 1956. It was declared of public utility on August 2, 1991.

It is currently the fourth French sports federation in terms of the number of members with about 592,000 members in 2011. As of May 29, 2009, the federation has 548,014 licensees distributed over 5,688 clubs. The largest club has more than 1,000 licensees (The Kodokan Club Courbevoie with 1019 licensed on May 29, 2009). The average number of licensees per club is about 96.

The Federation has 34 regional leagues and 85 departmental committees.

The current president of the federation, elected in 2005, is the former judoka Jean-Luc Rougé, first world champion in the history of French judo in 1975.

At the International Judo Federation Congress held in Rio de Janeiro (Brazil) in September 2007, on the sidelines of the 2007 World Judo Championships, the FFJDA was appointed by a large majority to organize the World Championships of judo in Paris in 2011.

References

External links
Official website

Sports organizations established in 1946
Judo organizations
Judo
Organizations based in Paris